In linear algebra, the rank of a matrix  is the dimension of the vector space generated (or spanned) by its columns. This, in turn, is identical to the dimension of the vector space spanned by its rows. There are multiple equivalent definitions of rank. A matrix's rank is one of its most fundamental characteristics.

Main definitions 

In this section, we give some definitions of the rank of a matrix.  Many definitions are possible; see Alternative definitions for several of these.

A fundamental result in linear algebra is that the column rank and the row rank are always equal.

A matrix is said to have full rank if its rank equals the largest possible for a matrix of the same dimensions, which is the lesser of the number of rows and columns.  A matrix is said to be rank-deficient if it does not have full rank. The rank deficiency of a matrix is the difference between the lesser of the number of rows and columns, and the rank.

Examples 
The matrix

has rank 2: the first two columns are linearly independent, so the rank is at least 2, but since the third is a linear combination of the first two (the first column minus the second), the three columns are linearly dependent so the rank must be less than 3.

The matrix

has rank 1: there are nonzero columns, so the rank is positive, but any pair of columns is linearly dependent.  Similarly, the transpose

of  has rank 1.

Computing the rank of a matrix

Rank from row echelon forms 

A common approach to finding the rank of a matrix is to reduce it to a simpler form, generally row echelon form, by elementary row operations. Row operations do not change the row space (hence do not change the row rank), and, being invertible, map the column space to an isomorphic space (hence do not change the column rank). Once in row echelon form, the rank is clearly the same for both row rank and column rank, and equals the number of pivots (or basic columns) and also the number of non-zero rows.

For example, the matrix  given by

can be put in reduced row-echelon form by using the following elementary row operations:

The final matrix (in row echelon form) has two non-zero rows and thus the rank of matrix  is 2.

Computation 
When applied to floating point computations on computers, basic Gaussian elimination (LU decomposition) can be unreliable, and a rank-revealing decomposition should be used instead. An effective alternative is the singular value decomposition (SVD), but there are other less expensive choices, such as QR decomposition with pivoting (so-called rank-revealing QR factorization), which are still more numerically robust than Gaussian elimination. Numerical determination of rank requires a criterion for deciding when a value, such as a singular value from the SVD, should be treated as zero, a practical choice which depends on both the matrix and the application.

Proofs that column rank = row rank

Proof using row reduction
The fact that the column and row ranks of any matrix are equal forms is fundamental in linear algebra. Many proofs have been given. Here is a variant of this proof:

It is straightforward to show that neither the row rank nor the column rank are changed by an elementary row operation. As Gaussian elimination proceeds by elementary row operations, the reduced row echelon form of a matrix has the same row rank and the same column rank as the original matrix. Further elementary column operations allow putting the matrix in the form of an identity matrix possibly bordered by rows and columns of zeros. Again, this changes neither the row rank nor the column rank. It is immediate that both the row and column ranks of this resulting matrix is the number of its nonzero entries.

We present two other proofs of this result. The first uses only basic properties of linear combinations of vectors, and is valid over any field. The proof is based upon Wardlaw (2005). The second uses orthogonality and is valid for matrices over the real numbers; it is based upon Mackiw (1995). Both proofs can be found in the book by Banerjee and Roy (2014).

Proof using linear combinations
Let  be an  matrix. Place these as the columns of an  matrix . (Also see Rank factorization.)

Proof using orthogonality
We claim that the vectors  are linearly independent. To see why, consider a linear homogeneous relation involving these vectors with scalar coefficients :

where .

This implies that . It follows that  are linearly independent.

Alternative definitions 
In all the definitions in this section, the matrix  is taken to be an  matrix over an arbitrary field .

Dimension of image 
Given the matrix , there is an associated linear mapping

defined by

This definition has the advantage that it can be applied to any linear map without need for a specific matrix.

Rank in terms of nullity 
The rank–nullity theorem states that this definition is equivalent to the preceding one.

Column rank – dimension of column space 

Row rank – dimension of row space 

Decomposition rank 
In fact, for all integers , the following are equivalent:

 there exist an  matrix  and a  matrix  such that  (when  is the rank, this is a rank factorization of ),

Indeed, the following equivalences are obvious: .

It follows from the equivalence  that the row rank is equal to the column rank.

As in the case of the "dimension of image" characterization, this can be generalized to a definition of the rank of any linear map: the rank of a linear map  is the minimal dimension  of an intermediate space  such that  can be written as the composition of a map  and a map . Unfortunately, this definition does not suggest an efficient manner to compute the rank (for which it is better to use one of the alternative definitions). See rank factorization for details.

Rank in terms of singular values 
The rank of  equals the number of non-zero singular values, which is the same as the number of non-zero diagonal elements in Σ in the singular value decomposition

Determinantal rank – size of largest non-vanishing minor 
(The order of a minor is the side-length of the square sub-matrix of which it is the determinant.) Like the decomposition rank characterization, this does not give an efficient way of computing the rank, but it is useful theoretically: a single non-zero minor witnesses a lower bound (namely its order) for the rank of the matrix, which can be useful (for example) to prove that certain operations do not lower the rank of a matrix.

A non-vanishing -minor ( submatrix with non-zero determinant) shows that the rows and columns of that submatrix are linearly independent, and thus those rows and columns of the full matrix are linearly independent (in the full matrix), so the row and column rank are at least as large as the determinantal rank; however, the converse is less straightforward.  The equivalence of determinantal rank and column rank is a strengthening of the statement that if the span of  vectors has dimension , then  of those vectors span the space (equivalently, that one can choose a spanning set that is a subset of the vectors): the equivalence implies that a subset of the rows and a subset of the columns simultaneously define an invertible submatrix (equivalently, if the span of  vectors has dimension , then  of these vectors span the space and there is a set of  coordinates on which they are linearly independent).

Tensor rank – minimum number of simple tensors 

This notion of rank is called tensor rank; it can be generalized in the separable models interpretation of the singular value decomposition.

Properties 

That is,  A matrix that has rank  is said to have full rank; otherwise, the matrix is rank deficient.
 Only a zero matrix has rank zero.
  is injective (or "one-to-one") if and only if  has rank  (in this case, we say that  has full column rank).
  is surjective (or "onto") if and only if  has rank  (in this case, we say that  has full row rank).
 If  is a square matrix (i.e.), then  is invertible if and only if  has rank  (that is,  has full rank).
 If  is any  matrix, then 
 If  is an  matrix of rank , then 
 If  is an  matrix of rank , then 
As a consequence, a rank- matrix can be written as the sum of  rank-1 matrices, but not fewer.
 The rank of a matrix plus the nullity of the matrix equals the number of columns of the matrix. (This is the rank–nullity theorem.)
Thus, for real matrices  This can be shown by proving equality of their null spaces. The null space of the Gram matrix is given by vectors  for which  If this condition is fulfilled, we also have 

Applications 
One useful application of calculating the rank of a matrix is the computation of the number of solutions of a system of linear equations. According to the Rouché–Capelli theorem, the system is inconsistent if the rank of the augmented matrix is greater than the rank of the coefficient matrix. If on the other hand, the ranks of these two matrices are equal, then the system must have at least one solution. The solution is unique if and only if the rank equals the number of variables. Otherwise the general solution has  free parameters where  is the difference between the number of variables and the rank.  In this case (and assuming the system of equations is in the real or complex numbers) the system of equations has infinitely many solutions.

In control theory, the rank of a matrix can be used to determine whether a linear system is controllable, or observable.

In the field of communication complexity, the rank of the communication matrix of a function gives bounds on the amount of communication needed for two parties to compute the function.

Generalization
There are different generalizations of the concept of rank to matrices over arbitrary rings, where column rank, row rank, dimension of column space, and dimension of row space of a matrix may be different from the others or may not exist.

Thinking of matrices as tensors, the tensor rank generalizes to arbitrary tensors; for tensors of order greater than 2 (matrices are order 2 tensors), rank is very hard to compute, unlike for matrices.

There is a notion of rank for smooth maps between smooth manifolds. It is equal to the linear rank of the derivative.

Matrices as tensors
Matrix rank should not be confused with tensor order, which is called tensor rank. Tensor order is the number of indices required to write a tensor, and thus matrices all have tensor order 2. More precisely, matrices are tensors of type (1,1), having one row index and one column index, also called covariant order 1 and contravariant order 1; see Tensor (intrinsic definition) for details.

The tensor rank of a matrix can also mean the minimum number of simple tensors necessary to express the matrix as a linear combination, and that this definition does agree with matrix rank as here discussed.

See also 
 Matroid rank
 Nonnegative rank (linear algebra)
 Rank (differential topology)
 Multicollinearity
 Linear dependence

Notes

References

Sources

Further reading
 
 Kaw, Autar K. Two Chapters from the book Introduction to Matrix Algebra: 1. Vectors  and System of Equations 
 Mike Brookes: Matrix Reference Manual. 

Linear algebra